Bytča is a town in northwestern Slovakia. It is located on the Váh River near the cities of Žilina and Považská Bystrica. It belongs to Upper Váh region of tourism.

Etymology
The name comes from a Slavic personal name Bytek, Bytko → Bytča.

History
The town arose in 1946 by a merger of the settlements Malá Bytča (including Beňov and Mikšová), Veľká Bytča and Hliník nad Váhom. The first written reference to the town's main part Veľká Bytča dates from 1234 as terra Bycha. The settlement got its town charter in 1378. It was the seat of a feudal dominion and later a town with many craftsmen. In Hungarian, it was known as Biccse.

Landmarks
The town features a famous castle the Thurzó Castle built as a water castle by Pongrác Szentmiklósi in the 13th century and rebuilt in the 16th century in Renaissance style by Ferenc Thurzó. The town also houses the Wedding Palace (built by György Thurzó for his daughters' wedding) from 1601, which is the only building of this kind in Slovakia, Renaissance, Baroque and Classical bourgeoisie houses, an archive, and a museum (in the Wedding Palace).

Demographics
According to the 2001 census, the town had 11,150 inhabitants. 98.27% of inhabitants were Slovaks and 0.58% Czechs. The religious make-up was 90.87% Roman Catholics, 4.35% people with no religious affiliation and 1.51% Lutherans.

Economy
Today, the town is home to machine (Kinex), textile, wood processing (sports equipment), and food (brewery) industries. The brewery closed in the 2010s.

Boroughs
Bytča includes the following former villages: Psurnovice, Hrabove, Horne Hlboke, Dolne Hlboke, Hlboke nad Vahom, Benov, Miksova, Hlinik nad Vahom, Velka Bytca, Mala Bytca.

Current boroughs (year of merger in brackets):
Beňov (c. 1899 with Malá Bytča, probably Hungarian name was Banya)
Hliník nad Váhom (1946, ; also called Vágagyagos between 1899 and 1919)
Hrabové (1971; ; also called Rabó between 1899 and 1919)
Mikšová (1907 with Malá Bytča)
Pšurnovice (1971; ; also called Legelővölgy between 1899 and 1919)
Veľká Bytča (1946;)

Twin towns — sister cities

Bytča is twinned with:
 Karolinka, Czech Republic
 Opoczno, Poland

Notable people
Adolf Neubauer, Jewish scholar
Jozef Tiso (1887–1947), Slovak priest, politician and leader of the First Slovak Republic (1939–1945) executed for war crimes

See also
 List of municipalities and towns in Slovakia

References

Genealogical resources

The records for genealogical research are available at the state archive "Statny Archiv in Bytca, Slovakia"

 Roman Catholic church records (births/marriages/deaths): 1630-1900 (parish A)

External links
Official municipal website
Surnames of living people in Bytca

Cities and towns in Slovakia
Castles in Slovakia
Villages and municipalities in Bytča District
Geography of Žilina Region
Populated places established in 1946
1946 establishments in Czechoslovakia